Hermann Bösch was a German fishing trawler that was requisitioned by the Kriegsmarine in the Second World War for use as a Vorpostenboot, serving as V 205 Hermann Bösch and V 202 Hermann Bösch.

Description
The engine was built by Deschimag Seebeck, Wesermünde and was rated at 96nominal horsepower. It drove a single screw propeller via a low-pressure turbine, double reduction gearing and a hydraulic coupling.

History
Hermann Bösch was built as yard number 592 by Deschimag, Wesermünde. She was launched in October 1937 and completed on 24 November. She was built for C. C. H. Bösch. She was completed by Deschimag Seebeck, Wesermünde. Her port of registry was Bremerhaven. The Code Letters DOTK and fishing boat registration BX 261 were allocated.

On 30 September 1939, Hermann Bösch was requisitioned by the Kriegsmarine and commissioned as the Vorpostenboot V 205 Hermann Bösch. She was redesignated V 202 Hermann Bösch on 20 October. Her captain survived, but 34 crew were killed. Vorpostenboot V 203 Carl Röver was damaged beyond repair in the same engagement.

References

Sources

1937 ships
Ships built in Bremen (state)
Steamships of Germany
Fishing vessels of Germany
Auxiliary ships of the Kriegsmarine
Maritime incidents in July 1942
World War II shipwrecks in the English Channel